Rory Bushfield (born May 30, 1983) is a Canadian professional skier, filmmaker, and  reality show star.

Bushfield is a former member of Canada's World Cup team, skiing moguls. He has also competed in slopestyle skiing before focusing on backcountry skiing and filmmaking.

Bushfield was a contestant on the reality diving competition Splash beginning in March 2013. He won the competition, defeating Nicole Eggert, on May 7, 2013.

Personal life
Bushfield and fellow freeskier Sarah Burke were married in Pemberton, British Columbia on September 25, 2010. Burke was a five-time gold medalist at the Winter X Games and won the world championship in halfpipe in 2005. She
died after a training accident in Utah on January 19, 2012. He started the Sarah Burke Foundation in her memory.

Bushfield lives in Squamish, British Columbia with his dog, Dexter. He is also a single-engine pilot.

Filmography
 Strike Three – Level 1 2002
 Forward – Level 1 2003
 Yearbook – Matchstick Productions 2004
 The Hit List – Matchstick Productions 2005
 Push – Matchstick Productions 2006
 Seven Sunny Days – Matchstick Productions 2007
 Claim – Matchstick Productions 2008
 In Deep – Matchstick Productions 2009
 The Way I See It – Matchstick Productions 2010
 One for the Road – Teton Gravity Research 2011
 Attack of La Niña – Matchstick Productions 2011
 All.I.Can. – Sherpa 2011
 Super Heroes of Stoke – Matchstick Productions 2012
 The Dream Factory – Teton Gravity Research 2012
 Into The Mind – Sherpas Cinema 2013

References

External links

1983 births
Canadian freeskiers
Extreme skiers
Sportspeople from Alberta
Living people
People from Squamish, British Columbia
People from Rocky View County
Participants in American reality television series